Last Request is a 2019 Nigerian film produced by Moses Olufemi and directed by James Abinibi. The movies stars Yemi Blaq, Linda Osifo, Antar Laniyan and Bimbo Akintola.

Synopsis 
A peaceful family became unsettled when the husband was diagnosed with a brain tumor and his last request was something outrageous.

Premiere 
The movie premiered at Silicon Valley African Film Festival 2019 California,  Black Film Festival Atlanta 2019, UK Nollywood Film Festival 2019 London, 23rd African Film Awards 2019 London and West African Film Festival Houston, Texas 2020.

Awards and nominations 
The film was nominated for 2019 UK film festival award, Best Director African Film Awards 2019, Best Producer African Film Awards 2019 and Best Supporting Actress African Film Awards 2019.

Cast 
Yomi Blaq, 
Linda Osifo,
Bimbo Akintola,
Antar Laniyan

See also
List of Nigerian films of 2019

References 

2019 films
Nigerian drama films
English-language Nigerian films